The Arizona Diamondbacks' 2011 season, the franchise's 14th season in Major League Baseball, included the team's first National League West championship since 2007, subsequently, their fifth division title since coming into MLB. They lost to the Milwaukee Brewers in five games in the Division Series.

Regular season

Season standings

Record vs. opponents

Game log

|-  bgcolor="ffbbbb"
|- align="center" bgcolor="bbffbb"
|1|| April 1 || @ Rockies || 7–6 (11)|| Demel (1–0) || Reynolds (0–1) || Putz (1) || 49,374 || 1–0
|- align="center" bgcolor="ffbbbb"
|2|| April 2 || @ Rockies || 1–3 || De La Rosa (1–0) || Hudson (0–1) || Street (1) || 40,216 || 1–1
|- align="center" bgcolor="bbbbbb"
| – || April 3 || @ Rockies || colspan="6" | Postponed (Inclement Weather) Game to be made up on May 24.
|- align="center" bgcolor="ffbbbb"
|3|| April 4 || @ Cubs || 1–4 || Wells (1–0) || Saunders (0–1) || || 26,292 || 1–2
|- align="center" bgcolor="ffbbbb"
|4|| April 5 || @ Cubs || 5–6 || Russell (1–0) || Demel (1–1) || Marshall (1) || 27,039 || 1–3
|- align="center" bgcolor="bbffbb"
|5|| April 6 || @ Cubs || 6–4 || Galarraga (1–0) || Dempster (0–2) || Putz (2) || 32,272 || 2–3
|- align="center" bgcolor="bbffbb"
|6|| April 8 || Reds || 13–2 || Kennedy (1–0) || Wood (1–1)|| || 48,027 || 3–3
|- align="center" bgcolor="ffbbbb"
|7|| April 9 || Reds || 1–6 || Arroyo (2–0) || Hudson (0–2) || || 20,719 || 3–4
|- align="center" bgcolor="bbffbb"
|8|| April 10 || Reds || 10–8 || Heilman (1–0) || Masset (0–2) || Putz (3) || 19,718 || 4–4
|- align="center" bgcolor="ffbbbb"
|9|| April 11 || Cardinals || 2–8 || McClellan (1–0) || Enright (0–1) || || 15,746 || 4–5
|- align="center" bgcolor="bbffbb"
|10|| April 12 || Cardinals || 13–8 || Galarraga (2–0) || Carpenter (0–2) || || 16,645 || 5–5
|- align="center" bgcolor="ffbbbb"
|11|| April 13 || Cardinals || 5–15 || Westbrook (1–1) || Kennedy (1–1) || || 17,660 || 5–6
|- align="center" bgcolor="ffbbbb"
|12|| April 15 || Giants || 2–5 || Cain (2–0) || Hudson (0–3) || Wilson (3) || 23,090 || 5–7
|- align="center" bgcolor="ffbbbb"
|13|| April 16 || Giants || 3–5 || Mota (1–0) || Saunders (0–2) || Wilson (4) || 25,590 || 5–8
|- align="center" bgcolor="bbffbb"
|14|| April 17 || Giants || 6–5 (12)|| Collmenter (1–0) || Runzler (1–2) || || 26,195 || 6–8
|- align="center" bgcolor="bbffbb"
|15|| April 19 || @ Reds || 5–4 || Galarraga (3–0) || LeCure (0–1) || Putz (4) || 12,994 || 7–8
|- align="center" bgcolor="bbffbb"
|16|| April 20 || @ Reds || 3–1 || Kennedy (2–1) || Arroyo (2–2) || Putz (5) || 14,915 || 8–8
|- align="center" bgcolor="ffbbbb"
|17|| April 21 || @ Reds || 4–7 || Leake (3–0) || Hudson (0–4) || || 17,319 || 8–9
|- align="center" bgcolor="ffbbbb"
|18|| April 22 || @ Mets || 1–4 || Pelfrey (1–2) || Vásquez (0–1) || Rodríguez (3) || 26,546 || 8–10
|- align="center" bgcolor="ffbbbb"
|19|| April 23 || @ Mets || 4–6 || Gee (2–0) || Enright (0–2) || Rodríguez (4) || 25,581 || 8–11
|- align="center" bgcolor="ffbbbb"
|20|| April 24 || @ Mets || 4–8 || Niese (1–3) || Galarraga (3–1) || || 22,232 || 8–12
|- align="center" bgcolor="bbffbb"
|21|| April 25 || Phillies || 4–0 || Kennedy (3–1) || Lee (2–2) || || 19,586 || 9–12
|- align="center" bgcolor="bbffbb"
|22|| April 26 || Phillies || 7–5 || Hudson (1–4) || Oswalt (3–1) || || 19,037 || 10–12
|- align="center" bgcolor="ffbbbb"
|23|| April 27 || Phillies  || 4–8 || Hamels (3–1) || Saunders (0–3) || || 21,825 || 10–13
|- align="center" bgcolor="bbffbb"
|24|| April 28 || Cubs || 11–2 || Enright (1–2) || Dempster (1–3) || || 21,716 || 11–13
|- align="center" bgcolor="ffbbbb"
|25|| April 29 || Cubs || 2–4 || Zambrano (3–1) || Galarraga (3–2) || Mármol (6) || 29,431 || 11–14
|- align="center" bgcolor="ffbbbb"
|26|| April 30 || Cubs || 3–5 || Garza (1–3) || Putz (0–1) || Mármol (7) || 27,652 || 11–15
|-

|-  bgcolor="ffbbbb"
|- align="center" bgcolor="bbffbb"
| 27 || May 1 || Cubs || 4–3 || Hudson (2–4) || Coleman (1–2) || Putz (6) || 26,605 || 12–15
|- align="center" bgcolor="bbffbb"
| 28 || May 3 || Rockies || 4–3 || Hernandez (1–0) || Paulino (0–1) || Putz (7) || 18,887 || 13–15
|- align="center" bgcolor="ffbbbb"
| 29 || May 4 || Rockies || 4–6 || Chacin (4–2) || Enright (1–3) || Street (11) || 18,803 || 13–16
|- align="center" bgcolor="bbffbb"
| 30 || May 5 || Rockies || 3–2 (11)|| Hernandez (2–0) || Belisle (2–2) || – || 18,695 || 14–16
|- align="center" bgcolor="ffbbbb"
| 31 || May 6 || @ Padres || 3–4 (11)|| Qualls (1–2) || Demel (1–2) || – || 30,878 || 14–17
|- align="center" bgcolor="bbffbb"
| 32 || May 7 || @ Padres || 6–0 || Hudson (3–4) || Moseley (1–4) || – || 35,936 || 15–17
|- align="center" bgcolor="ffbbbb"
| 33 || May 8 || @ Padres || 3–4 || Harang (5–2) || Saunders (0–4) || Bell (8) || 21,490 || 15–18
|- align="center" bgcolor="ffbbbb"
| 34 || May 10 || @ Giants || 0–1 || Wilson (3–1) || Hernandez (2–1) || – || 41,039 || 15–19
|- align="center" bgcolor="ffbbbb"
| 35 || May 11 || @ Giants || 3–4 || Sánchez (3–2) || Galarraga (3–3) || Wilson (12) || 41,026 || 15–20
|- align="center" bgcolor="ffbbbb"
| 36 || May 12 || @ Giants || 2–3 || Cain (3–2) || Hudson (3–5) || López (1) || 41,126 || 15–21
|- align="center" bgcolor="ffbbbb"
| 37 || May 13 || @ Dodgers || 3–4 || Kershaw (5–3) || Saunders (0–5) || Jansen (1) || 35,506 || 15–22
|- align="center" bgcolor="bbffbb"
| 38 || May 14 || @ Dodgers || 1–0 || Collmenter (2–0) || Billingsley (2–3) || Putz (8) || 30,602 || 16–22
|- align="center" bgcolor="bbffbb"
| 39 || May 15 || @ Dodgers || 4–1 || Kennedy (4–1) || Lilly (3–4) || Putz (9) || 40,654 || 17–22
|- align="center" bgcolor="ffbbbb"
| 40 || May 16 || Padres || 4–8 || Richard (2–4) || Galarraga (3–4) || Adams (1) || 17,958 || 17–23
|- align="center" bgcolor="bbffbb"
| 41 || May 17 || Padres || 6–1 || Hudson (4–5) || Stauffer (0–2) || || 16,365 || 18–23
|- align="center" bgcolor="bbffbb"
| 42 || May 18 || Braves || 5–4 (11)|| Heilman (2–0) || Kimbrel (1–2) || – || 19,773 || 19–23
|- align="center" bgcolor="bbffbb"
| 43 || May 19 || Braves || 2–1 || Collmenter (3–0) || Jurrjens (5–1) || Putz (10) || 23,413 || 20–23
|- align="center" bgcolor="bbffbb"
| 44 || May 20 || Twins || 8–7 || Kennedy (5–1) || Duensing (2–4) || Paterson (1) || 27,450 || 21–23
|- align="center" bgcolor="bbffbb"
| 45 || May 21 || Twins || 9–6 || Heilman (3–0) || Capps (1–3) || Putz (11) || 39,776 || 22–23
|- align="center" bgcolor="bbffbb"
| 46 || May 22 || Twins || 3–2 || Hudson (5–5) || Burnett (0–3) || Putz (12) || 31,017 || 23–23
|- align="center" bgcolor="ffbbbb"
| 47 || May 24 || @ Rockies || 4–12 || Reynolds (2–0) || Collmenter (3–1) || || 26,378 || 23–24
|- align="center" bgcolor="bbffbb"
| 48 || May 24 || @ Rockies || 5–2 || Saunders (1–5) || Chacin (5–3) || Putz (13) || 25,096 || 24–24
|- align="center" bgcolor="bbffbb"
| 49 || May 25 || @ Rockies || 2–1 || Kennedy (6–1) || Hammel (3–4) || Putz (14) || 26,972 || 25–24
|- align="center" bgcolor="bbffbb"
| 50 || May 26 || @ Rockies || 6–3 || Owings (1–0) || Mortensen (1–2) || Hernandez (1) || 30,186 || 26–24
|- align="center" bgcolor="bbffbb"
| 51 || May 27 || @ Astros || 7–6 || Hudson (6–5) || López (1–2) || Putz (15) || 21,834 || 27–24
|- align="center" bgcolor="bbffbb"
| 52 || May 28 || @ Astros || 11–3 || Duke (1–0) || Norris (2–4) || – || 31,405 || 28–24
|- align="center" bgcolor="bbffbb"
| 53 || May 29 || @ Astros || 4–2 || Heilman (4–0) || Fulchino (1–3) || Putz (16) || 21,882 || 29–24
|- align="center" bgcolor="bbffbb"
| 54 || May 30 || Marlins || 15–4 || Saunders (2–5) || Volstad (2–4) || – || 23,465 || 30–24
|- align="center" bgcolor="ffbbbb"
| 55 || May 31 || Marlins || 2–5 || Sánchez (5–1) || Kennedy (6–2) || Oviedo (19) || 17,571 || 30–25
|-

|-  bgcolor="ffbbbb"
|- align="center" bgcolor="bbffbb"
| 56 || June 1 || Marlins || 6–5 || Putz (1–1) || Hensley (0–2) || – || 16,169 || 31–25
|- align="center" bgcolor="ffbbbb"
| 57 || June 2 || Nationals || 1–6 || Zimmermann (3–6) || Duke (1–1) || Storen (11) || 17,810 || 31–26
|- align="center" bgcolor="bbffbb"
| 58 || June 3 || Nationals || 4–0 || Collmenter (4–1) || Maya (0–1) || – || 20,332 || 32–26
|- align="center" bgcolor="bbffbb"
| 59 || June 4 || Nationals || 2–0 || Saunders (3–5) || Hernandez (3–7) || Putz (17) || 26,199 || 33–26
|- align="center" bgcolor="ffbbbb"
| 60 || June 5 || Nationals || 4–9 (11)|| Burnett (1–2) || Paterson (0–1) || – || 23,129 || 33–27
|- align="center" bgcolor="ffbbbb"
| 61 || June 7 || @ Pirates || 5–8 || Resop (2–1) || Hernandez (2–2) || Hanrahan (15) || 12,378 || 33–28
|- align="center" bgcolor="ffbbbb"
| 62 || June 8 || @ Pirates || 2–3 (12)|| McCutchen (2–1) || Kroenke (0–1) || – || 14,015 || 33–29
|- align="center" bgcolor="bbffbb"
| 63 || June 9 || @ Pirates || 2–0 || Owings (2–0) || Resop (2–2) || Hernandez (2) || 12,468 || 34–29
|- align="center" bgcolor="ffbbbb"
| 64 || June 10 || @ Marlins || 4–6 || Sánchez (6–1) || Saunders (3–6) || Cishek (1) || 18,888 || 34–30
|- align="center" bgcolor="bbffbb"
| 65 || June 11 || @ Marlins || 9–5 || Kennedy (7–2) || Vázquez (3–6) || – || 25,321 || 35–30
|- align="center" bgcolor="bbffbb"
| 66 || June 12 || @ Marlins || 5–1 || Hudson (7–5) || Hand (0–2) || – || 16,353 || 36–30
|- align="center" bgcolor="bbffbb"
| 67 || June 13 || @ Marlins || 12–9 || Owings (3–0) || Nolasco (4–2) || Putz (18) || 15,065 || 37–30
|- align="center" bgcolor="ffbbbb"
| 68 || June 14 || Giants || 5–6 || Cain (6–4) || Collmenter (4–2) || Wilson (19) || 23,746 || 37–31
|- align="center" bgcolor="ffbbbb"
| 69 || June 15 || Giants || 2–5 || Bumgarner (3–8) || Saunders (3–7) || Wilson (20) || 24,194 || 37–32
|- align="center" bgcolor="bbffbb"
| 70 || June 16 || Giants || 3–2 (10) || Hernandez (3–2) || Casilla (0–1) || – || 23,468 || 38–32
|- align="center" bgcolor="bbffbb"
| 71 || June 17 || White Sox || 4–1 || Hudson (8–5) || Jackson (4–6) || – || 26,053 || 39–32
|- align="center" bgcolor="ffbbbb"
| 72 || June 18 || White Sox || 2–6 ||  ||  || – || 33,230 || 39–33
|- align="center" bgcolor="ffbbbb"
| 73 || June 19 || White Sox || 2–8 || || || – || 39,538 || 39–34
|- align="center" bgcolor="bbffbb"
| 74 || June 21 || @ Royals || 7–2 || Saunders (4–7) || || – || 19,305 || 40–34
|- align="center" bgcolor="bbffbb"
| 75 || June 22 || @ Royals || 3–2 || || || || 14,265 || 41–34
|- align="center" bgcolor="bbffbb"
| 76 || June 23 || @ Royals || 5–3 ||  || || || 23,610 || 42–34
|- align="center" bgcolor="bbffbb"
| 77 || June 24 || @ Tigers || 7–6 || || || || 37,335 || 43–34
|- align="center" bgcolor="ffbbbb"
| 78 || June 25 || @ Tigers || 0–6 || || || – || 43,163 || 43–35
|- align="center" bgcolor="ffbbbb"
| 79 || June 26 || @ Tigers || 3–8 || || || – || 41,036 || 43–36
|- align="center" bgcolor="ffbbbb"
| 80 || June 27 || Indians || 4–5 || || || || 25,726 || 43–37
|- align="center" bgcolor="bbffbb"
| 81 || June 28 || Indians || 6–4 || || || – || 27,076 || 44–37
|- align="center" bgcolor="ffbbbb"
| 82 || June 29 || Indians || 2–6 || || || – || 26,876 || 44–38
|-

|-  bgcolor="ffbbbb"
|- align="center" bgcolor="ffbbbb"
| 83 || July 1 || @ Athletics || 4–5 || || || || 12,216 || 44–39
|- align="center" bgcolor="bbffbb"
| 84 || July 2 || @ Athletics || 4–2 || Saunders (5–7) || || || 30,338 || 45–39
|- align="center" bgcolor="ffbbbb"
| 85 || July 3 || @ Athletics || 2–7 || || || || 13,822 || 45–40
|- align="center" bgcolor="bbffbb"
| 86 || July 4 || @ Brewers || 8–6 || || || || 41,622 || 46–40
|- align="center" bgcolor="bbffbb"
| 87 || July 5 || @ Brewers || 7–3 || || || || 34,014 || 47–40
|- align="center" bgcolor="ffbbbb"
| 88 || July 6 || @ Brewers || 1–3 || || || || 36,470 || 47–41
|- align="center" bgcolor="bbffbb"
| 89 || July 7 || @ Cardinals || 4–1 || Saunders (6–7) || || || 35,274 || 48–41
|- align="center" bgcolor="bbffbb"
| 90 || July 8 || @ Cardinals || 7–6 || || || || 37,160 || 49–41
|- align="center" bgcolor="ffbbbb"
| 91 || July 9 || @ Cardinals || 6–7 || || || || 42,745 || 49–42
|- align="center" bgcolor="ffbbbb"
| 92 || July 10 || @ Cardinals || 2–4 || || || || 35,299 || 49–43
|- align="center" bgcolor="ffbbbb"
| 93 || July 15 || Dodgers || 4–6 || Kershaw (10–4) || Saunders (6–8) || Guerra (5) || 24,966 || 49–44
|- align="center" bgcolor="bbffbb"
| 94 || July 16 || Dodgers || 3–2 ||  || || || 28,897 || 50–44
|- align="center" bgcolor="bbffbb"
| 95 || July 17 || Dodgers || 4–1 || || || || 27,683 || 51–44
|- align="center" bgcolor="bbffbb"
| 96 || July 18 || Brewers || 3–0 || || || || 17,404 || 52–44
|- align="center" bgcolor="ffbbbb"
| 97 || July 19 || Brewers || 3–11 || || || || 17,831 || 52–45
|- align="center" bgcolor="ffbbbb"
| 98 || July 20 || Brewers || 2–5 (10)|| || || || 19,196 || 52–46
|- align="center" bgcolor="bbffbb"
| 99 || July 21 || Brewers || 4–0 || || || || 22,241 || 53–46
|- align="center" bgcolor="ffbbbb"
| 100 || July 22 || Rockies || 4–8 || || || || 22,768 || 53–47
|- align="center" bgcolor="bbffbb"
| 101 || July 23 || Rockies || 12–3 || || || || 34,849 || 54–47
|- align="center" bgcolor="bbffbb"
| 102 || July 24 || Rockies || 7–0 || || || || 28,090 || 55–47
|- align="center" bgcolor="bbffbb"
| 103 || July 26 || @ Padres || 6–1 || Saunders (7–8) || || || 22,679 || 56–47
|- align="center" bgcolor="bbffbb"
| 104 || July 27 || @ Padres || 4–3 ||  ||  || Putz (22) || 28,377 || 57–47
|- align="center" bgcolor="ffbbbb"
| 105 || July 28 || @ Padres || 3–4 ||  ||  ||  || 23,348 || 57–48
|- align="center" bgcolor="ffbbbb"
| 106 || July 29 || @ Dodgers || 5–9 ||  ||  ||  || 35,169 || 57–49
|- align="center" bgcolor="bbffbb"
| 107 || July 30 || @ Dodgers || 6–4 ||  || 37,139 || Putz (23) ||  || 58–49
|- align="center" bgcolor="bbffbb"
| 108 || July 31 || @ Dodgers || 6–3 || Saunders (8–8) ||  || Putz (24) || 43,935 || 59–49
|-

|-  bgcolor="ffbbbb"
|- align="center" bgcolor="bbffbb"
| 109 || August 1 || @ Giants || 5–2 || || || Putz (25) || 42,366 || 60–49
|- align="center" bgcolor="bbffbb"
| 110 || August 2 || @ Giants || 6–1 || || || || 42,332 || 61–49
|- align="center" bgcolor="ffbbbb"
| 111 || August 3 || @ Giants || 1–8 || || || || 42,477 || 61–50
|- align="center" bgcolor="ffbbbb"
| 112 || August 5 || Dodgers || 4–7 || || ||  || 27,215 || 61–51
|- align="center" bgcolor="ffbbbb"
| 113 || August 6 || Dodgers || 3–5 || || || || 33,239 || 61–52
|- align="center" bgcolor="bbffbb"
| 114 || August 7 || Dodgers || 4–3 || || || Putz (26) || 25,575 || 62–52
|- align="center" bgcolor="ffbbbb"
| 115 || August 8 || Astros || 1–9 || || || || 17,448 || 62–53
|- align="center" bgcolor="bbffbb"
| 116 || August 9 || Astros || 11–9 || || || Putz (27) || 17,814 || 63–53
|- align="center" bgcolor="bbffbb"
| 117 || August 10 || Astros || 6–3 || || || || 18,628 || 64–53
|- align="center" bgcolor="bbffbb"
| 118 || August 11 || Astros || 8–5 (10) || || || || 18,418 || 65–53
|- align="center" bgcolor="bbffbb"
| 119 || August 12 || Mets || 4–3 || || || Putz (28) || 25,701 || 66–53
|- align="center" bgcolor="bbffbb"
| 120 || August 13 || Mets || 6–4 || || || Putz (29) || 33,552 || 67–53
|- align="center" bgcolor="bbffbb"
| 121 || August 14 || Mets || 5–3 || || || || 30,148 || 68–53
|- align="center" bgcolor="bbffbb"
| 122 || August 16 || @ Phillies || 3–2 || || || Putz (30) || 45,742 || 69–53
|- align="center" bgcolor="ffbbbb"
| 123 || August 17 || @ Phillies || 2–9 || || || || 45,894 || 69–54
|- align="center" bgcolor="ffbbbb"
| 124 || August 18 || @ Phillies || 1–4 || || || || 45,633 || 69–55
|- align="center" bgcolor="ffbbbb"
| 125 || August 19 || @ Braves || 2–4 || || || || 30,142 || 69–56
|- align="center" bgcolor="ffbbbb"
| 126 || August 20 || @ Braves || 1–8 || || || || 39,294 || 69–57
|- align="center" bgcolor="ffbbbb"
| 127 || August 21 || @ Braves || 0–1 || || || || 34,846 || 69–58
|- align="center" bgcolor="ffbbbb"
| 128 || August 22 || @ Nationals || 1–4 || || || || 19,377 || 69–59
|- align="center" bgcolor="bbffbb"
| 129 || August 23 || @ Nationals || 2–0 || || || Putz (31) || 17,029 || 70–59
|- align="center" bgcolor="bbffbb"
| 130 || August 24 || @ Nationals || 4–2 || || || Putz (32) || 17,881 || 71–59
|- align="center" bgcolor="bbffbb"
| 131 || August 25 || @ Nationals || 8–1 || || || || 17,666 || 72–59
|- align="center" bgcolor="bbffbb"
| 132 || August 26 || Padres || 5–0 || || || || 34,074 || 73–59
|- align="center" bgcolor="bbffbb"
| 133 || August 27 || Padres || 3–1 || || || Putz (33) || 35,603 || 74–59
|- align="center" bgcolor="bbffbb"
| 134 || August 28 || Padres || 6–1 || || || || 27,564 || 75–59
|- align="center" bgcolor="bbffbb"
| 135 || August 29 || Rockies || 5–1 || || || Putz (34) || 19,478 || 76–59
|- align="center" bgcolor="bbffbb"
| 136 || August 30 || Rockies || 9–4 || || || || 20,231 || 77–59
|- align="center" bgcolor="bbffbb"
| 137 || August 31 || Rockies || 4–2 || || || Putz (35) || 23,062 || 78–59
|-

|-  bgcolor="ffbbbb"
|- align="center" bgcolor="ffbbbb"
| 138 || September 2 || @ Giants || 2–6 || Cain (11–9) || Saunders (9–12) || || 40,948 || 78–60
|- align="center" bgcolor="bbffbb"
| 139 || September 3 || @ Giants || 7–2 || Kennedy (18 4) || Lincecum (12 12) || || 41,951 || 79–60
|- align="center" bgcolor="bbffbb"
| 140 || September 4 || @ Giants || 4–1 || || || Putz (36) || 42,222 || 80–60
|- align="center"  bgcolor="bbffbb"
| 141 || September 5 || Rockies || 10–7 || || || || 40,342 || 81–60
|- align="center" bgcolor="ffbbbb"
| 142 || September 6 || Rockies || 3–8 || || || || 25,691 || 81–61
|- align="center"  bgcolor="bbffbb"
| 143 || September 7 || Rockies || 5–3 || Saunders (10–12) || || Putz (37) || 25,320 || 82–61
|- align="center"  bgcolor="bbffbb"
| 144 || September 8 || Padres || 4–1 || || || Putz (38) || 21,402 || 83–61
|- align="center"  bgcolor="bbffbb"
| 145 || September 9 || Padres || 3–2 || || || || 29,639 || 84–61
|- align="center"  bgcolor="bbffbb"
| 146 || September 10 || Padres || 6–5 (10) || || || || 48,017 || 85–61
|- align="center"  bgcolor="ffbbbb"
| 147 || September 11 || Padres || 6–7 || || || || 39,369 || 85–62
|- align="center"  bgcolor="bbffbb"
| 148 || September 12 || @ Dodgers || 7–2 || Saunders (11–12) || || Putz (39) || 30,616 || 86–62
|- align="center"  bgcolor="bbffbb"
| 149 || September 13 || @ Dodgers || 5–4 (10) || || || Putz (40) || 31,404 || 87–62
|- align="center" bgcolor="ffbbbb"
| 150 || September 14 || @ Dodgers || 2–3 || || || || 29,799 || 87–63
|- align="center" bgcolor="ffbbbb"
| 151 || September 16 || @ Padres || 0–2 || || || || 28,605 || 87–64
|- align="center" bgcolor="ffbbbb"
| 152 || September 17 || @ Padres || 1–3 || || || || 36,242 || 87–65
|- align="center"  bgcolor="bbffbb"
| 153 || September 18 || @ Padres || 5–1 || Saunders (12–12) || || Putz (41) || 30,781 || 88–65
|- align="center"  bgcolor="bbffbb"
| 154 || September 19 || Pirates || 1–0 || || || Putz (42) || 24,458 || 89–65
|- align="center" bgcolor="ffbbbb"
| 155 || September 20 || Pirates || 3–5 ||  || Hudson (16–11) ||  || 30,114 || 89–66
|- align="center"  bgcolor="bbffbb"
| 156 || September 21 || Pirates || 8–5 || Miley (4–2) || || Putz (43) || 25,296 || 90–66
|- align="center"  bgcolor="bbffbb"
| 157 || September 23 || Giants || 3–1 ||  || || Putz (44) || 42,606 || 91–66
|- align="center"  bgcolor="bbffbb"
| 158 || September 24 || Giants || 15–2 ||  || || || 49,076 || 92–66
|- align="center"  bgcolor="bbffbb"
| 159 || September 25 || Giants || 5–2 ||  || || Putz (45) || 41,243 || 93–66
|- align="center" bgcolor="ffbbbb"
| 150 || September 26 || Dodgers || 2–4 || || || || 29,116 || 93–67
|- align="center"  bgcolor="bbffbb"
| 161 || September 27 || Dodgers || 7–6 (10) || Owings (8–0) || Guerra (2–2) || || 25,669 || 94–67
|- align="center" bgcolor="ffbbbb"
| 162 || September 28 || Dodgers || 5–7 || Lilly (12–14) || Saunders (12–13) || Jansen (5) || 41,791 || 94–68
|-

Opening game
Friday, April 1, 2011 at Coors Field in Denver, Colorado

Last game
Friday, October 7, 2011 at Miller Park in Milwaukee, Wisconsin

Roster

Player stats

Batting
Note: G = Games played; AB = At bats; R = Runs scored; H = Hits; 2B = Doubles; 3B = Triples; HR = Home runs; RBI = Runs batted in; AVG = Batting average; SB = Stolen bases

All stats through September 28, 2011.

Pitching
Note: W = Wins; L = Losses; ERA = Earned run average; G = Games pitched; GS = Games started; SV = Saves; IP = Innings pitched; H = Hits allowed; R = Runs allowed; ER = Earned runs allowed; BB = Walks allowed; K = Strikeouts 

All stats through September 28, 2011.

2011 N.L. Division Series vs. Milwaukee Brewers

Farm system

League Champions: Mobile

References

External links

 2011 Arizona Diamondbacks season at Baseball Reference
 2011 Arizona Diamondbacks season Official Site

Arizona Diamondbacks seasons
Arizona Diamondbacks
National League West champion seasons
Arizonia